Azhdar Khowsh is a village in Tasuj Rural District, Shonbeh and Tasuj District, Dashti County, Bushehr Province, Iran. At the 2006 census, its population was 52, in 13 families.

References 

Populated places in Dashti County